The 2008 New Hampshire gubernatorial election, took place on November 4, 2008. Incumbent governor John Lynch won his third term with a landslide victory over Republican opponent Joseph Kenney.

Democratic primary

Candidates
John Lynch, incumbent Governor of New Hampshire
Kathryn Forry

Results

Republican primary

Candidates
Joseph Kenney, New Hampshire State Senator

Results

General election

Predictions

Polling

Results

References

External links
Elections Division from the New Hampshire Secretary of State
New Hampshire Governor candidates at Project Vote Smart
New Hampshire Governor race from OurCampaigns.com
New Hampshire Governor race from 2008 Race Tracker
Campaign contributions from Follow the Money
Kenney (R) vs. Lynch (D-i) graph of collected polls from Pollster.com
Official campaign websites
John Lynch, Democratic incumbent candidate
Joseph Kenney, Republican candidate

2008
2008 United States gubernatorial elections

Gubernatorial